The Supreme Court of Canada is the highest court of Canada. It was established by the Parliament of Canada through the Supreme and Exchequer Court Act of 1875, as authorized by Section 101 of the Constitution Act, 1867.  Since 1949, the Court has been the final court of appeal in the Canadian justice system. (Previously, it had functioned as an intermediate appellate court subject to appeal to the Judicial Committee of the Privy Council in the United Kingdom.) Parliament initially fixed the size of the Court at six justices: the chief justice of Canada and five puisne justices; and, until 1887, the justices also sat individually as judges of the Exchequer Court. A sixth puisne justice was added in 1927, bringing the Court to a total of seven justices. Two additional puisne seats were created in 1949, bringing the Court to a total of nine justices, which is its current complement.

The following tables trace the succession of justices of the Supreme Court of Canada by seat. Justices are appointed by the governor general on the advice of the prime minister. When a chief justice leaves office, the vacancy is traditionally filled by elevating an incumbent puisne justice to the position, which requires a separate appointment process. There are no formal numbers or names for the individual puisne justice seats, which are listed in this article simply by number and the name of the first puisne justice to occupy it, as well as by the year in which each was established by Parliament. The numbering of puisne justice seats established simultaneously,  and  reflects the order of precedence of the inaugural justices to occupy those seats.

The start date listed for each justice is the day he or she took the judicial oath of office, and the end date is the date of the justice's death, resignation, retirement, or appointment as chief justice. The names of incumbents are in bold.

Original seats

Additional seats

Notes

References

Sources 
 Dates of service from:

External links 
 Supreme Court of Canada homepage

Supreme Court justices